Mini Menon is an Indian journalist and author. She is the co-founder and editor at Live History India.

Mini Menon was formerly the Executive Editor of Bloomberg TV India, where she was in charge of news and features shows. She has also reported on political, economic and business news. She has won awards for her work as a news anchor and journalist. In 2013 she was adjudged as one of the 10 most influential women in Indian Marketing, Advertising and Media by Impact magazine and was also called a "popular face on Indian news television" by The Times of India.

Biography 
Mini was born in Jammu in a Malayali family from Kerala and her father was in the army. Her early years were spent across India as her father (late Lt. Gen P E Menon) was posted in different parts of the country. 

Mini graduated from St Stephen’s College, Delhi with a degree in History. Mini participated in and won the Femina Miss India Asia Pacific title after her second year in college in 1996. She went on to do her Masters in Communication Research in the University of Pune. In 2001, she won the Chevening scholarship and went to study Broadcast journalism in UK.

Career 
As co-founder and editor of Live History India, Mini Menon will drive the content and vision for the company. Live History India is a digital media company focused on the stories that make India.

Over the last 16 years, Mini has covered both political and business news. Menon first started working at TVi and moved on to Star TV Network. She was the news anchor for Goodlife on CNBC TV18 in 2004.

At Bloomberg TV India, Mini did a popular series, "Inside India's Best Known Companies", where she interviewed India's leading businessmen and CEOs. She also led feature programming and had been responsible for creating cutting edge shows like "The Pitch" and "Assignment" and award-winning documentaries like "In Focus".

In 2013, Mini's book - Riding The Wave - on seven of India's leading businessmen was published by HarperCollins. The book covers how these businessmen used "changing trends" in India in order to shape modern industries.

Awards and recognition 
In 2008- 2009, she was judged the best business news anchor by the Indian Broadcast Federation, Zee Astitva Award for Journalism, Rajiv Gandhi award for Excellence as a young achiever, Miss India Asia Pacific.

Initiatives & Associations 
2012- Invited to be a member of CII’s National Committee on Marketing, 2014- took over as the Regional Chairperson of CII's Indian women network IWN.

In 2014, Mini also joined the National Advisory Board of Enactus.

2021- Mini is also closely associated with www.peepultree.in an e-commerce website that has created a platform for award-winning artisans from across India.

References

External links
 https://web.archive.org/web/20130503093104/http://ibnlive.in.com/photogallery/13333.html
 https://web.archive.org/web/20140529155143/http://www.nasscom.in/sites/default/files/Speakers/Mini%20Menon-%20Final.pdf
 http://www.indiantelevision.com/special/y2k4/cnbc_team.htm
 https://web.archive.org/web/20130916191617/http://harpercollins.co.in/author.asp?Author_Code=2454

Journalists from Jammu and Kashmir
Living people
Indian women journalists
People from Jammu (city)
20th-century Indian journalists
Year of birth missing (living people)
20th-century Indian women